Asghar Hajiloo is a retired Iranian football defender who played for Iran in the 1984 Asian Cup. He also played for Esteghlal.

International Records

Honours 
Esteghlal
Iranian Football League (2): 1981–82 (Runner-up), 1982–83, 1984–85, 1987–88 (Runner-up)
Hazfi Cup (1): 1976–77

External links
Team Nelli Stats

References

Living people
1956 births
Iranian footballers
Esteghlal F.C. players
Footballers at the 1986 Asian Games
Association football defenders
Asian Games competitors for Iran